Luigi Gandini (9 July 1928 – 20 March 1987) was an Italian rower. He competed at the 1948 Summer Olympics in London with the men's eight where they were eliminated in the semi-final.

References

External links
 

1928 births
1987 deaths
Italian male rowers
Olympic rowers of Italy
Rowers at the 1948 Summer Olympics
European Rowing Championships medalists